Maria Konopnicka (23 May 1842 – 8 October 1910) was a Polish poet, novelist, children's writer, translator, journalist, critic, and activist for women's rights and for Polish independence.  She used pseudonyms, including Jan Sawa. She was one of the most important poets of Poland's Positivist period.

Life
Konopnicka was born in Suwałki on 23 May 1842. Her father, Józef Wasiłowski, was a lawyer. She was  home-schooled and spent a year (1855–56) at a convent pension of the Sisters of Eucharistic Adoration in Warsaw (Zespół klasztorny sakramentek w Warszawie).

She made her debut as a writer in 1870 with the poem, "W zimowy poranek" ("On a Winter's Morn"). She gained popularity after the 1876 publication of her poem, "W górach" ("In the Mountains"), which was praised by future Nobel laureate Henryk Sienkiewicz.
In 1862 she married Jarosław Konopnicki. They had six children. The marriage was not a happy one, as her husband disapproved of her writing career. In a letter to a friend, she described herself as "having no family" and as being "a bird locked in a cage". Eventually in 1878, in an unofficial separation, she left her husband and moved to Warsaw to pursue writing. She took her children with her. She would often travel in Europe; her first major trip was to Italy in 1883. She spent the years 1890–1903 living abroad in Europe.Her life has been described as "turbulent", including extramarital romances, deaths, and mental illnesses in the family. She was a friend of a Polish woman poet of the Positivist period, Eliza Orzeszkowa, and of the painter and activist Maria Dulębianka (with whom she lived in a possibly romantic relationship). It has been speculated that she was bisexual or a lesbian (particularly in relation to Dulębianka), though this has not been properly researched, and the question is not usually mentioned in biographies of Konopnicka. Konopnicka’s wish was to be buried together with Dulębianka. Both women were laid to rest together at a cemetery in Lviv, Ukraine.
In addition to being an active writer, she was also a social activist, organizing and participating in protests against the repression of ethnic (primarily Polish) and religious minorities in Prussia. She was also involved in women's-rights activism.

Her literary work in the 1880s gained wide recognition in Poland. In 1884 she began writing children's literature, and in 1888 she debuted as an adult-prose writer with 
Cztery nowele (Four Short Stories). Due to the growing popularity of her writings, in 1902 a number of Polish activists decided to reward her by buying her a manor house. It was purchased with funds collected by a number of organizations and activists. As Poland was not an independent country at the time, and as her writings were politically uncongenial to the Prussian and Russian authorities, a location was chosen in the more tolerant Austrian partition of pre-Partition Poland. In 1903 she received a manor in Żarnowiec, where she arrived on 8 September. She would spend most springs and summers there, but she would still travel about Europe in fall and winter.
She died in Lwów (now Lviv, Ukraine) on 8 October 1910. She was buried there in the Łyczakowski Cemetery. As per her wish Dulębianka was laid to rest next to her.

Work 

Konopnicka wrote prose (primarily short stories) as well as poems. One of her most characteristic styles were poems stylized as folk songs. She would try her hand at many genres of literature, such as reportage sketches, narrative memoirs, psychological portrait studies and others.

A common theme in her works was the oppression and poverty of the peasantry, workers, and Polish Jews. Due to her sympathy for Jewish people, she was considered a philosemite. Her works were also highly patriotic and nationalistic.

One of her best known works is the long epic in six cantos, Mister Balcer in Brazil (Pan Balcer w Brazylii, 1910), on the Polish emigrants in Brazil.  Another one was Rota (Oath, 1908) which set to the music by Feliks Nowowiejski two years later became an unofficial anthem of Poland, particularly in the territories of the Prussian Partition. This patriotic poem was strongly critical of the Germanization policies and thus described as anti-German.Her most famous children's literature work is the 1896 O krasonoludkach i sierotce Marysi (Little Orphan Mary and the Gnomes). Her children literature works were well received, as compared to many other works of the period.

Maria Konopnicka also composed a poem about the execution of the Irish patriot, Robert Emmet.  Emmet was executed by the British authorities in Dublin in 1803, but Konopnicka published her poem on the topic in 1908.

She was also a translator. Her translated works include Ada Negri's Fatalita and Tempeste, published in Poland in 1901.

Memorials
 In 1922, the Maria Konopnicka Special Education School Complex was established in Pabianice.
 Kononpnicka mansion in Żarnowiec was converted into a museum, opened in 1957, the Maria Konopnicka Museum in Żarnowiec (Muzeum Marii Konopnickiej w Żarnowcu). Another museum, the Maria Konopnicka Museum in Suwałki, was opened in 1973.
 A number of schools and other institutions, including several streets and plazas, bear her name in Poland. Polish Merchant Navy ship MS Maria Konopnicka was also named after her. Several plaques and monuments to her have been constructed. One of the most recent ones is a monument to her built in Suwałki in 2010. A crater on Venus was named after her in 1994.
 In Warsaw, in 2010 on the centenary of the poet's death, an International Maria Konopnicka Prize was created in recognition of organic work .

Selected works

Poetry 
 Linie i dźwięki (Lines and Sounds, 1897)
 Śpiewnik historyczny (Historical Music Book, 1904)
 Głosy ciszy (Sounds of Silence, 1906)
 Z liryk i obrazków (Lyrics and Pictures, 1909)
 Pan Balcer w Brazylii (Mister Balcer in Brazil, 1910)

Prose 
 Cztery nowele (Four Short Stories, 1888)
 Moi znajomi (People I Know, 1890)
 Na drodze (On the Way, 1893)
 Ludzie i rzeczy (People and Things, 1898)
 Mendel Gdański

Children's
 Śpiewnik dla dzieci (Songbook for Children).
 O Janku Wędrowniczku (About Johnnie the Wanderer).
 O krasnoludkach i sierotce Marysi (About the Dwarfs and Little Orphan Mary).
 Na jagody (Picking Blueberries).

Poems 
 Rota (Oath, 1908).
 Stefek Burczymucha.
 Wolny najmita (The Free Day-Labourer).

Notes

Further reading 
 Brodzka, Alina. Maria Konopnicka, "Wiedza Powszechna", Warszawa, 1975.
 Baculewski, Jan. Śladami życia i twórczości Marii Konopnickiej, Ludowa Spółdzielnia Wydawnicza, Warszawa, 1966.
 G. Borkowska, Ruchliwa fala (Maria Konopnicka i kwestia kobieca), [in:] Maria Konopnicka. Głosy o życiu i pisarstwie w 150-lecie urodzin. Warszawa 1992

External links

 
 
 
 Maria Konopnicka at culture.pl
 Maria Konopnicka's poems in poezja.org
 Selected Maria Konopnicka's Poems at PoemHunter.com

1842 births
1910 deaths
People from Suwałki
People from Augustów Governorate
Polish women novelists
Polish essayists
Polish women essayists
Polish women poets
Polish women's rights activists
19th-century Polish poets
20th-century Polish poets
19th-century Polish novelists
19th-century Polish women writers
19th-century Polish writers
20th-century Polish women writers
20th-century Polish writers
Burials at Lychakiv Cemetery
19th-century essayists
20th-century essayists
Polish translators
19th-century translators
Pseudonymous women writers
19th-century pseudonymous writers
20th-century pseudonymous writers
Polish positivists